Cyphomenes schremmeri is a species of insect in the genus Cyphomenes and the family Eumenidae described by Antonio Giordani Soika in 1978. C. schremmeri is native to Venezuela and Colombia. As of 2017, no subspecies are listed in the Catalogue of Life.

References

Hymenoptera of South America
Potter wasps
Insects described in 1978